The 2014–15 Michigan Wolverines women's basketball team will represent University of Michigan during the 2014–15 NCAA Division I women's basketball season. The Wolverines, led by third year head coach Kim Barnes Arico, play their home games at the Crisler Center and were members of the Big Ten Conference. They finished the season 20–15, 8–10 in Big Ten play to finish in eighth place. They lost in the second round in the Big Ten women's basketball tournament to their in-state rival Michigan State. They were invited to the Women's National Invitation Tournament where they defeated Cleveland State, Toledo and Missouri in the first, second and third rounds, Southern Miss in the quarterfinals before losing to UCLA in the semifinals.

Roster

Schedule

|-
!colspan=9 style="background:#242961; color:#F7BE05;"| Exhibition

|-
!colspan=9 style="background:#242961; color:#F7BE05;"| Non-conference regular season

|-
!colspan=9 style="background:#242961; color:#F7BE05;"| Big Ten regular season

|-
!colspan=9 style="text-align: center; background:#242961"|Big Ten Women's Tournament

|-
!colspan=9 style="text-align: center; background:#242961"|WNIT

See also
2014–15 Michigan Wolverines men's basketball team

Rankings

References

Michigan
Michigan
Michigan
2015 Women's National Invitation Tournament participants
Michigan Wolverines women's basketball seasons